Abu Bakr ibn Faris, Abu Yahya, was Marinid Sultan of Morocco from 1358 to 1359.

Life 
Abu Bakr ibn Faris assumed the throne in 1358 succeeding Muhammad II ibn Faris.  He was in turn succeeded by Ibrahim ibn Ali in 1359.

References
Citations

Sources

People from Fez, Morocco
Marinid sultans of Morocco
14th-century Berber people
14th-century Moroccan people
14th-century monarchs in Africa